Boy Jati Asmara (born 4 December 1984 in Bandung) is an Indonesian footballer who currently played for Persepam Madura United.

References

1984 births
Association football forwards
Living people
Indonesian footballers
Liga 1 (Indonesia) players
Arema F.C. players
Deltras F.C. players
Persitara Jakarta Utara players
Indonesian Premier Division players
Persib Bandung players
Persikabo Bogor players
Persijatim players
Persipura Jayapura players
PSMS Medan players
Sportspeople from Bandung